Mian Rud (also Romanized as Mīān Rūd; also known as Mīānrūd-e Bālā) is a village in Gil Dulab Rural District, in the Central District of Rezvanshahr County, Gilan Province, Iran. At the 2006 census, its population was 502, in 132 families.

References 

Populated places in Rezvanshahr County